AEN is may refer to:

 Acute esophageal necrosis, a rare esophageal disorder
 A+E Networks, a media organization based in the United States
 AEN Ayiou Georgiou Vrysoullon-Acheritou, an association football club in the Agios Georgios refugee settlement in Cyprus
 Alliance for Europe of the Nations, a pan-European political party 
 Alfred E. Neuman, a fictional character in MAD magazine 
 Armenian Environmental Network
 Armenian Sign Language
 asynchronous event notification in (for example) the NC-SI electrical interface